Refaat Ali Suleiman Al-Gammal (July 1, 1927 – January 30, 1982), better known as Raafat Al-Haggan in Egypt and as Jack Bitton in Israel, was an Egyptian spy who spent 17 years performing clandestine operations in Israel.

Egyptian General Intelligence Directorate (EGID), claims that he moved to Israel as an Egyptian Intelligence asset in 1956. He was well known in the Israeli society and was involved in commercial projects. According to the Egyptians, he provided the Egyptian intelligence service with important information while operating a tourism company as a front. Al-Gammal's intelligence concerned, among other things, the Six-Day War, and he had an important role in the Yom Kippur War by providing Egypt with detailed engineering data about the Bar Lev Line. Al-Gammal is considered a national hero in Egypt. Most information about him is still confidential.

Early life according to the EGID 

Al-Gammal was born in Damietta in what was then the Kingdom of Egypt (nowadays the Arab Republic of Egypt) on July 1, 1927. His father was a coal trader and his mother a housewife who spoke English, French and Arabic.

AlGammal learned English and French in a private school. In 1936, his father died leaving Al-Gammal's older brother Samy responsible for the family. Samy moved the family to Cairo. There, after his father's death Al-Gammal's half brother Samy decided to not pay for the high cost of private school, so he enrolled him in the intermediate school of commerce where Al-Gammal was astonished by the British and impressed by their struggle against the onslaught of the Nazis. Al-Gammal became an Anglophile, learning English so fluently as to effect a British accent.

He graduated in 1946 and took a job as an accountant for an oil company working in the Red Sea. He was later accused of stealing money from the company and fired. He then moved from one job to another and eventually worked as an assistant to an accounting officer on the ship Horus. He left Egypt for the first time of his life on Horus, traveling to Naples, Genoa, Marseille, Barcelona, Tangier and eventually Liverpool.

There in Liverpool, he worked in a tourism company, later moving to the United States without a visa or a Green Card. His immigration status forced him to move to Canada and then to Germany where the Egyptian Consulate accused him of selling his passport and refused to give him a travel document. He was arrested by the German Police who deported him to Egypt. Back in Egypt, with neither a job nor an identification, Al-Gammal turned to the black market to get papers to the name of "Ali Mostafa". With these, he went to work for the company managing the Suez Canal.

The revolution of 1952 broke out, and the British realized that the Egyptians sympathized with the new government, and they grew more stringent in fighting counterfeiting. Refaat, worried that he would be discovered, left his job and got a new fake passport from a Swiss journalist, moving from one name to another until he was arrested by a British officer while traveling to Libya in 1953. He was arrested carrying a British passport but the British officer thought he was Israeli, so he was handed over to the Egyptian Intelligence service which started investigating him as a probable Israeli spy.

The main charge against Al-Gammal was that he had pretended to be a Jewish officer named "David Artson". At the same time, he was carrying a British passport with the name of "Danial Caldwell". The Egyptians also found checks signed with the name "Refaat Al-Gammal" with him and realised that he spoke Arabic fluently. Officer Hassan Hosny of the secret police was responsible for the investigation. Al-Gammal eventually confessed his true identity, his whole story and how he had merged with the Israelis.

Working for the EGID
Hosny attempted several times to recruit Al-Gammal, who eventually had to choose between jail or working for the Egyptian General Intelligence Directorate (EGID) under a new identity. Al-Gammal chose EGID, and underwent extensive training where he learned the goals of the revolution, economics and the success secrets of multi-national firms in addition to the habits, behavior, history and religion of Jews. He also learned how to tell the Ashkenazi Jews from the Sephardi Jews, how to fight, and to take photos covertly and with miniaturised cameras. He also learned radio communications, intelligence collection and how to make bombs. He assumed the identity of Jacques Beton, an Ashkenazi Jew born 1919 to a French father and an Italian mother. He then moved to live in Alexandria in a neighbourhood mainly inhabited by the Jews and took a decent job in an insurance company. He approached the Jews until he became an important figure among the secret Jewish movements in Egypt.

His role in the Lavon Affair

The Lavon Affair refers to the scandal over a failed Israeli covert operation in Egypt known as Operation Susannah, in which Egyptian, American and British-owned targets in Egypt were bombed in the summer of 1954. It became known as the Lavon Affair after the Israeli defense minister Pinhas Lavon, who was forced to resign because of the incident, or euphemistically as the Unfortunate Affair (Hebrew: עסק הביש Esek HaBish). Israel admitted responsibility in 2005.

In his diaries, Al-Gammal mentions that he joined Unit 131, which was to carry out the operation, along with many names which later proved to be of great importance, such as Eli Cohen, an Israeli spy who became an adviser to the defense minister in Syria. According to the EGID, Al-Gammal had the major role in the discovery and arrest of the unit. Later, Cohen was discovered by Syrian counter-espionage experts that caught him in the act of sending a radio message after large amounts of radio interference brought attention.

Achievements according to the EGID
 Notified Egypt of the time of the Suez Crisis attack.
 Notified Egypt of the time of the 1967 attack.
 Developed close friendships with Moshe Dayan, Ezer Weizman and David Ben-Gurion.
 Supplied Egypt with a lot of information that helped Egypt to achieve tactical surprise and complete all objectives during Operation Badr (1973)
 Notified Egypt of the intent of Israel to conduct nuclear experiments and test some modern high-tech weapons while meeting his handler in Milan.

In popular culture
The life of Al-Gammal as a spy was written by famous writer Saleh Mursi. Because of its invigorating accounts, Egyptian television made a three-season series based on the book. Both book and series were called "Ra'fat El-Haggan". By that time almost the entire Arab world knew of the story and praised him for his work and sacrifice.

Al-Gammal loved acting and appeared in 3 successive movies with the then-famous Egyptian actor Bishara Wakim.

See also
Gumaa AL-Shawan
Heba Selim
Ibrahim Shaheen and Inshirah Moussa

References

Further reading
 Bar-Zohar, Michael and Nissim Mishal (2014), Mossad - The Greatest Missions of the Israeli Secret Service, HarperCollinsPublishers, 
 Dunstan, Simon (2009), The Six Day War 1967: Sinai, Osprey Publishing,

External links
 https://web.archive.org/web/20160304001141/http://nakshaat.com/forum/viewtopic.php?f=94&t=33294 
 https://web.archive.org/web/20070624192148/http://www.akhbarelyom.org.eg/adab/issues/586/1100.html 
 https://web.archive.org/web/20070629214643/http://www.sotaliraq.com/i/article_2003_02_2_ll15.html 
 https://web.archive.org/web/20070914151252/http://www.alrai.com/pages.php?news_id=85895 
 
 

1927 births
1982 deaths
20th-century Egyptian businesspeople
Egyptian spies
People from Damietta